Lenin Steenkamp (born 9 September 1969 in Durban, South Africa) is a retired South African football player who spent his entire career in the United States.

College
In 1989, Steenkamp entered the College of Boca Raton on a soccer scholarship. Steenkamp was a 1989, 1991 and 1992 First Team NAIA All American soccer player. In 1989 and 1990, Boca Raton finished runner-up in the NAIA national men's soccer championship. In 1991, the school changed its name to Lynn University and the soccer team won the NAIA national championship. Steenkamp scored both goals in the final and was the tournament MVP. Steenkamp graduated in 1993 and is a member of the Lynn University Athletic Hall of Fame.

Club
During the 1992 college off-season, Steenkamp played for the Boca Raton Sabres of the USISL. In 1993, Steenkamp played for the amateur Club Boca Rotan. This brought him to the attention of the Fort Lauderdale Strikers who signed him for the 1994 American Professional Soccer League season. He missed the first nine games of the season because of visa problems. Then, in July and August 1994, the Strikers sent him on loan to the Carolina Vipers of the Continental Indoor Soccer League. In 1995, he moved to the Atlanta Ruckus. In October 1995, Steenkamp signed with the Tampa Bay Terror of the National Professional Soccer League. He was named to the 1995–1996 All Rookie Team. Steenkamp began the 1996 A-League season with the Ruckus, but was traded to the Montreal Impact in June 1996 despite leading the team with nine goals. The Impact then sent him to the Rochester Rhinos one day later in exchange for Gustavo Romanello and Gustavo Villagra. Steenkamp remained with the Rhinos until his retirement. However, he continued to play indoor soccer, signing with the Buffalo Blizzard in January 1997 and played through the end of the season.

In 2003, Steenkamp became an assistant coach with the Rhinos.

Inaugural Member of Rochester Rhinos Hall of Fame
On 28 July 2011, the Rochester Rhinos announced that Steenkamp would be the first member to be inducted to the new Rhinos Hall of Fame in a ceremony that took place at halftime during the 5 August 2011 match at Sahlen's Stadium. Steenkamp is the all-time leader in games (268) and minutes played (21,613) for the Rochester Rhinos.

References

1969 births
Living people
Sportspeople from Durban
American Professional Soccer League players
Association football midfielders
Atlanta Silverbacks players
Boca Raton Sabres players
Buffalo Blizzard players
Carolina Vipers players
Continental Indoor Soccer League players
Fort Lauderdale Strikers (1988–1994) players
Lynn Fighting Knights men's soccer players
National Professional Soccer League (1984–2001) players
Rochester New York FC players
South African soccer players
South African expatriate soccer players
South African soccer managers
South African expatriate sportspeople in the United States
Tampa Bay Terror players
USL First Division players
USISL players